Elin Harlow is a Welsh female squash player. She has represented Wales in junior and senior level competitions. She achieved her highest career singles ranking of 92 in May 2016.

Career 
Elin caught the attention after being crowned as champion in French Junior Open Squash tournament on three occasions. She won the 2011 tournament in Under 13 category and then went onto become champion in Under 17 category in two consecutive years in 2013 and 2014.

She then went onto represent Wales at senior level for the first time at the 2014 Women's World Team Squash Championships. Interestingly, Wales women's team recorded the best result at a World Championship by placing at 9th position. She also took part at the 2016-17 PSA World Tour.

References 

Living people
Welsh female squash players
Sportspeople from Bangor, Gwynedd
Year of birth missing (living people)